Filippos Tigkas (born November 5, 2002) is a Cypriot professional basketball player for Keravnos of the Cypriot League.

Early career
Tigkas started playing basketball with Apollon Limassol in Cyprus. At the age of 16, he was transferred to AEK Athens of the Greek League, where he played with the junior team of the club. He also took several practices with AEK Athens Men’s Team.

Professional career
On July 7, 2020 Tigkas returned to Cyprus and signed with Apollon Limassol of the Cypriot League. In his first professional season, Tigkas averaged 7.7 points and 2.7 assists with Apollon. In the summer of 2021 Keravnos Strovolou and AEK Larnaca battled in order to secure his signature. Tigkas decided to join Keravnos Strovolou in the end.

References
3. Rebound.com.cy - Phillip Tigkas is the biggest asset of Cypriot Basketball

External links
RealGM.com Profile

https://rebound.cyprustimes.com/kypros/filippos-tigkas-o-polytimoteros-pic/

Living people
2002 births
Cypriot men's basketball players
Keravnos B.C. players
Point guards